Headington Hill Hall stands on Headington Hill in the east of Oxford, England. It was built in 1824 
for the Morrell family, who remained in residence for 114 years. It became the home to Pergamon Press and to media tycoon Robert Maxwell. It currently houses Oxford Brookes School of Law.

History
The hall was built in 1824 for the Morrell family, local brewers, and was extended between 1856 and 1858 by James Morrell Jr. (1810–1863) who built an Italianate mansion designed by the architect John Thomas. James Morrell and his wife Alicia died in 1863 and 1864, leaving their possessions including the hall and the brewery on trust for their 10 year old daughter Emily Morrell. The three trustees tried to deal with Emily's crush on a distant cousin by sending her away to an aunt and forbidding any communication between the pair. Emily married her cousin and made her home at the Hall.

Oscar Wilde, gaudily dressed as Prince Rupert, attended an all-night fancy dress May Day Ball given by Emily and Herbert Morrell at the Hall for around 300 guests on 1 May 1878. Lady Ottoline Morrell (1873–1938), who owned the Hall for a period, was particularly associated with the Bloomsbury Group as a hostess.

From 1939, the property was requisitioned by the government for use as a military hospital during World War II. After the war, it became a rehabilitation centre, run by the Red Cross and the Order of St John.

In 1953 James Morrell III sold Headington Hill Hall to Oxford City Council. It continued to be used as a rehabilitation centre until 1958.

Subsequently, the publisher Robert Maxwell (1923–1991), founder of Pergamon Press, took a lease of the building rented from the Council for 32 years as a residence and offices. He described it as the "best council house in the country." Maxwell commissioned a stained-glass window depicting Samson at the Gates of Gaza by Israeli sculptor Nehemia Azaz for the imperial staircase.

Since 1992, the Council has leased the property to Oxford Brookes University. It houses the Oxford Brookes University School of Law.

See also
 Headington Hill Park

References

External links 
 

Country houses in Oxfordshire
Grade II* listed buildings in Oxford
History of Oxford
Houses completed in 1824
Oxford Brookes University
Robert Maxwell